On June 5, 2008, diplomatic staff from both the United States and the United Kingdom were attacked and abducted by Zimbabwean security forces. Five Americans and four British diplomats were among the victims. Additional diplomats from the European Union and Japan, the Netherlands, and Tanzania were also detained. 

The diplomats, including the American ambassador, James D. McGee, were investigating violence in the country, as the next round of the presidential election starts. Some diplomats managed to flee from the vehicles as they were stopped at a rural roadblock on the way to Harare.

International reaction

United Kingdom
The British Secretary of State for Foreign and Commonwealth Affairs David Miliband said

They were going about their business properly registered as diplomats. I am pleased to say they are all safe and sound and unharmed, and there was no violence involved. This gives us a window onto the lives of ordinary Zimbabweans, because this sort of intimidation is something that is suffered daily, especially by those working with opposition groups. It is a window into lives which, in some cases, are marked by brutal intimidation, by torture and, in 53 cases documented in the past few weeks, by death.

United States
State Department spokesman Sean McCormack said
It's outrageous and unacceptable. While the immediate incident has been resolved it will not be forgotten. This did not just happen. This wasn't 40 people standing by the side of the road who decided to take this on.

McCormack also stated that the US intended to take this to the Security Council.

References

2008 in Zimbabwe
2008 in international relations
Diplomatic immunity and protection
Diplomatic incidents
United Kingdom–Zimbabwe relations
United States–Zimbabwe relations
United Kingdom–United States relations